Dutch Mason,  (19 February 1938 – 23 December 2006) was a Canadian musician from Halifax, Nova Scotia. He was inducted into the Canadian Jazz and Blues Hall of Fame, and was inducted into the Order of Canada in 2005.

Career
Dutch started performing as a musician in the mid-1950s, usually playing rock and roll or rockabilly standards as well as traditional music from the Canadian Maritimes. Dutch regularly played the local twin city lounge scene, notably The Wyse Owl/Eastern Billiards, The Dartmouth Inn and The Monterey in Halifax. As he began to become known as a blues artist in the sixties, he started to tour various parts of Canada. Into the 1970s and onwards, he became a very popular act and toured the country regularly, performing at the legendary Albert Hall in Toronto and the Rising Sun in Montreal.

In 1998, during his 60th birthday celebration, the CBC recorded a live tribute CD that includes performances by the Nova Scotia Mass Choir, Sam Moon and Frank MacKay. In 2004, he was nominated for a Juno Award for Best Blues album and in 2005 nominated for Best Blues album at the East Coast Music Awards.

Dutch is survived by his sons Charlie Mason and Garrett Mason, who won the 2005 Juno Award for Best Blues album.

Discography
 Dutch Mason Trio at the Candlelight – 1971
 Putting It All Together – 1971
 The Blues Ain't Bad – 1976
 Janitor of the Blues – 1977
 Wish Me Luck – 1979
 Dutch Mason Blues - 1979
 Special Brew – 1980
 Gimmee A Break – early 1982
 I'm Back – 1991
 You Can't Have Everything – 1992
 Prime Minister of the Blues - 1993
 Appearing Nightly – 1996
 Dutchie's 60th Birthday – 1998
 Goodtimes'' – 1999

References

External links
Dutch Mason website
Nova Scotia Classic Rock
Dutch 'Prime Minister of the Blues' Mason dies (CTV News)

1938 births
2006 deaths
People from Lunenburg County, Nova Scotia
Canadian people of British descent
Canadian blues guitarists
Canadian male guitarists
Canadian blues singers
Canadian blues pianists
Deaths from diabetes
Members of the Order of Canada
Attic Records (Canada) artists
Musicians from Nova Scotia
20th-century Canadian male singers
20th-century Canadian pianists
20th-century Canadian guitarists
Canadian male pianists
20th-century Canadian male musicians